Sabanetas may refer to:

Sabanetas (Ponce) - a barrio in Ponce, Puerto Rico
Sabanetas (Mayagüez) - a barrio in Mayagüez, Puerto Rico